Charles Joshua Oliver (1 November 1905 – 25 September 1977) was a New Zealand rugby union international who also represented his country in first-class cricket.

Cricket career
Wanganui-born Oliver played as a specialist right-handed batsman and from 35 first-class matches scored 1301 runs at 23.23, with a best of 91. He represented Canterbury in domestic cricket, having debuted for them in the 1923/24 Plunket Shield. In the 1925/26 season he was a member of the New Zealand side which toured Australia and he made half-centuries against Victoria and South Australia. He also toured the British Isles in 1927 with the national side. He claimed the only wicket of his first-class career during this tour, that of Sussex bowler Reginald Hollingdale.

New Zealand didn't gain Test status in cricket until 1930 and by then he had decided to focus on his rugby, thus missing out on a chance to become a Test 'double international'.

Rugby career

Oliver's early rugby had been played with Merivale before he made his way into the Canterbury side. He toured Australia in 1929 and made his Test debut for the All Blacks in a match against Australia at Sydney, aged 23. For the 1935/36 tour of Great Britain, Oliver was vice-captain and appeared in four Tests. By the time he retired he had amassed seven Test caps and 33 All Black matches in all, for 58 points.

He spent the final years of his life in Australia. His son-in-law Dave Gillespie was also an All Black.

References

External links

Scrum.com: Charles Oliver
Cricinfo: Charlie Oliver
Charlie Oliver at CricketArchive

1905 births
1977 deaths
New Zealand rugby union players
New Zealand international rugby union players
New Zealand cricketers
Pre-1930 New Zealand representative cricketers
Canterbury cricketers
Royal New Zealand Air Force cricketers
Rugby union centres
Rugby union players from Whanganui